The Pleasant Street School is a historic school building on Pleasant Street in Ayer, Massachusetts.  It is a -story Colonial Revival building, with a hip roof pierced by wide gabled dormers with bands of small windows.  It was constructed in 1893 to a design by Boston architect Charles E. Parks, and is one of the oldest school buildings in the town.  It was enlarged in 1906, doubling it in size.  It served as a public school until 1984.

The building was listed on the National Register of Historic Places in 1986.

See also
National Register of Historic Places listings in Middlesex County, Massachusetts

References

School buildings on the National Register of Historic Places in Massachusetts
National Register of Historic Places in Middlesex County, Massachusetts
Ayer, Massachusetts